Darkot pass (el. 15,430 ft., open May through October) is a high mountain pass that connects Baroghil Valley in Chitral and Rawat valley of Ghizer District in Gilgit, Pakistan. It is also known as "Darkut".

The pass is about 10 miles to the east of Koyo Zom (Zum) (6872m), the highest peak in Ghizer District. The border between Chitral and Northern Areas runs through the pass over Darkot Glacier. Eight miles to the south is Darkot village on the River Darkot, a small tributary of Ghizer River). To the southwest of Darkot pass is Chitral. Ten miles to the northwest of the pass is Chilmarabad, a village one mile south of the Boroghil pass.

See also
 Chikaar
 Baroghil Valley

Mountain passes of Gilgit-Baltistan
Chitral District
Ghizer District
Hindu Raj